Redgate is a software company based in Cambridge, England.

Redgate may also refer to:

People
 Elizabeth Redgate, British historian
 Jim Redgate, Australian classical guitar luthier
 Oliver Redgate (1898–1929), British World War I flying ace
 Oliver Redgate (cricketer) (1863–1913), English cricketer
 Riley Redgate, American writer
 Roger Redgate (born 1958), British musician and conductor
 Sam Redgate (1810–1851), English cricketer
 Thomas Redgate (1809–1874), English cricketer

Other uses
 , a British cargo ship in service 1953–63
 Redgate, Queensland, Australia
 Redgate, Western Australia, Australia

See also
 Red Gate, a triumphal arch in Moscow
 The Memorial Gate for Virtuous Women (also known as The Red Gate), a 1962 South Korean film